William Clarke College is an independent, P-12, co-educational Anglican College located in Kellyville in Sydney's north west (Hills District), Australia.

History 

Local church congregations wanted to establish an independent, affordable, co-educational College in the developing north-western suburbs of Sydney. The aim was to provide a high quality education that was academically strong and well rounded, delivered in a clear Christian context. 
 
William Clarke College opened in 1969 with 113 students in Years 7 and 8 using the St Stephen's Anglican Church in Kellyville as a temporary site. The college is named after the Rev William Branwhite Clarke, who was a minister of the gospel and the first incumbent of the Parish of Castle Hill, Rouse Hill and Dural. As well as his parish duties, he was the second Headmaster of The King's School in Parramatta and a scientist who is remembered as the founder of Australian Geology. The college has over 1600 students and 200 staff. Dr Marsh was appointed the third Headmaster to succeed David Raphael in 2017.

In 2007 the college introduced a Junior School (Kindergarten to Year 4), Middle School (Years 5–8) and Senior School (Years 9–12). In 2015 the college opened a Preparatory School. From 2018, the college's structure was changed to P-6 (Primary) and 7-12 (Secondary).

School Houses

See also 
 List of non-government schools in New South Wales

References

External links 
 

1988 establishments in Australia
Anglican secondary schools in Sydney
Anglican primary schools in Sydney
Junior School Heads Association of Australia Member Schools
Educational institutions established in 1988
The Hills Shire

Students Favourites 
Miss Devlin 
Mrs Acret 
Mr Chahine 
Ms Lindsay 
Mr Ternary 
Mr Morrison 
Miss Gatt 
Uncle Jimmy